List of cultural heritage landmarks of national significance in Volyn Oblast.

According to the 2009 Cabinet of Ukraine statement there are total of 23 landmarks of national significance. Yet, in 2011 a head specialist in cultural heritage preservation and museumification affairs of the Regional State Administration directorate of culture and tourism Petro Khodan declared that on territory of Volyn (Volhynia or Volyn Oblast) are 202 landmarks of national significance with 179 landmarks of urban planning and architecture.

Listings

List of historic and cultural reserves

 Historic and Cultural Reserve "Old Lutsk"
 State Historic and Cultural Reserve "Ancient Volodymyr"

References

External links
 Rada.gov.ua: Objects of cultural heritage of national significance in the State Registry of Immobile Landmarks of Ukraine — 2009 Resolution of Cabinet of Ministers of Ukraine.

.
.
.cultural heritage landmarks
History of Volyn Oblast
Tourism in Volyn Oblast
Volyn Oblast